G Lalbiakvela (born 28 January 1988) is an Indian cricketer. He made his List A debut on 19 September 2018, for Mizoram in the 2018–19 Vijay Hazare Trophy. He made his first-class debut on 1 November 2018, for Mizoram in the 2018–19 Ranji Trophy. He made his Twenty20 debut on 21 February 2019, also for Mizoram, in the 2018–19 Syed Mushtaq Ali Trophy.

References

External links
 

1988 births
Living people
Indian cricketers
Mizoram cricketers
Place of birth missing (living people)